Kudelski may refer to:

 André Kudelski (born 1960), CEO of the Kudelski Group
 Bob Kudelski (born 1964), American ice hockey player
 Carl Matthias Kudelski (1805–1877), a German composer
 Stefan Kudelski (1929–2013), Polish audio engineer
 Andrzej Kudelski (born 1952), Polish Olympic wrestler
 Kudelski Group, a Swiss technology company